Cannarozzi is a surname. Notable people with the surname include:

 Antonella Cannarozzi, Italian costume designer 
 Pete Cannarozzi, keyboardist on It's Alright (I See Rainbows)
 Ted Cannarozzi, program directory for WRBQ-FM